David Carabott (born 18 May 1968) is a former professional footballer who played for as a defender or midfielder. Born in Australia, he was capped 122 times for the Malta national team, making him second most capped player in Maltese football history.

Club career 

Carabott was born on 18 May 1968 in Melbourne, Australia, and his family moved to Malta at an early age. He joined local club Marsaxlokk in 1979 and made his first team debut in the Third Division match against Mellieħa in the 1981–82 season. He slowly became a regular fixture with the team, and in 1987 he joined Premier League side Hibernians. In 1993, with the arrival of new coach Brian Talbot, Hibernians soon transformed to a title-challenging side, winning two league titles in the 1993–94 and 1994–95 season. Carabott during this time established himself as one of the best wing-backs in the game.

International career 

Carabott made his first appearance for the Maltese senior team on 15 November 1987, a 1–1 draw against Switzerland. A year later, on 23 November 1988, he scored his first international goal, the opener in a 1–1 draw against Cyprus. In total he played 122 times for the national team and with 12 goals, Carabott was at one point one of the highest scorers. One of these was a goal in a friendly against England, played on 3 June 2000, which temporarily equalised the game, although England went on to score the winner later on. Carabott also had a chance to score a second equaliser late on when Malta were awarded another penalty, but this effort was saved by Richard Wright.

Statistics

International

International goals 

"Score" represents the score in the match after Carabott's goal.

See also
 List of men's footballers with 100 or more international caps

References

External links 
 David Carabott at MaltaFootball.com 
 
 

1968 births
Living people
Soccer players from Melbourne
People with acquired Maltese citizenship
Maltese footballers
Malta international footballers
Marsaxlokk F.C. players
Għajnsielem F.C. players
Hibernians F.C. players
Valletta F.C. players
Msida Saint-Joseph F.C. players
Sliema Wanderers F.C. players
Balzan F.C. players
FIFA Century Club
Association football defenders
Australian emigrants to Malta